Grudzień is a Polish surname which means "December". Notable people with the surname include:
 Józef Grudzień (1939–2017), Polish boxer
 Peter Grudzien (1941–2013), American musician
 Piotr Grudzień (born 1991), Polish Paralympic table tennis player

See also
 

Polish-language surnames